Serena Williams was the defending champion, but withdrew before her quarterfinal match with a knee injury.

Maria Sharapova won the title, defeating Petra Kvitová in the final, 6–4, 2–6, 6–3.

Seeds

The four Wuhan semifinalists received a bye into the second round. They were as follows:
  Eugenie Bouchard
  Petra Kvitová
  Elina Svitolina
  Caroline Wozniacki

Draw

Finals

Top half

Section 1

Section 2

Bottom half

Section 3

Section 4

Qualifying

Seeds

Qualifiers

Draw

First qualifier

Second qualifier

Third qualifier

Fourth qualifier

Fifth qualifier

Sixth qualifier

Seventh qualifier

Eighth qualifier

External links
 Main Draw
 Qualifying Draw

Open Women's Singles